Suk Hyun-joon (born 9 June 1985) is a South Korean former professional tennis player.

Suk, a native of Pohang, was ranked 11th on the ITF Junior Circuit. While a student at Myongji University he represented South Korea at the 2005 Summer Universiade. In 2005 he also played on the South Korea Davis Cup team for a tie against the Philippines in Manila. He is a former coach of Australian Open semi-finalist Chung Hyeon.

See also
List of South Korea Davis Cup team representatives

References

External links
 
 
 

1985 births
Living people
South Korean male tennis players
People from Pohang
Sportspeople from North Gyeongsang Province
Myongji University alumni
Competitors at the 2005 Summer Universiade
21st-century South Korean people